Bell station is a METRORail light rail station in Houston, Texas. The station was opened on January 1, 2004 and is operated by the Metropolitan Transit Authority of Harris County, Texas (METRO). It is located at the intersection of Main Street and Bell Street in Downtown Houston. This is the fourth station heading south along the rail line.

Points of interest
Within several blocks of either platform is the new retail, office & dining complex called GreenStreet. International corporations including Chevron & ExxonMobil also have office buildings within walking distance. It is also the closest stop to the Toyota Center (where the NBA basketball team Houston Rockets play) which is 3 to 4 blocks away.

References

METRORail stations
Railway stations in the United States opened in 2004
2004 establishments in Texas
Railway stations in Harris County, Texas